Kailer Yamamoto (born September 29, 1998) is an American professional ice hockey right winger for the  Edmonton Oilers of the National Hockey League (NHL). He was selected in the first round, 22nd overall, by the Oilers in the 2017 NHL Entry Draft.

Playing career

Junior
Yamamoto played in the 2011 Quebec International Pee-Wee Hockey Tournament with the Los Angeles Selects minor ice hockey team. He later played for the Los Angeles Jr. Kings of the Tier 1 Elite Hockey League. Yamamoto had racked up 40 points in only 34 games. He would then go on to play in the Western Hockey League.

Yamamoto was selected in the fifth round, 105th overall in the 2013 WHL Bantam Draft by his hometown team, the Spokane Chiefs. In his rookie season with the Chiefs, in 2014–15, he posted 23 goals and 57 points in 68 games. He was a top scorer at the 2015 Ivan Hlinka Memorial Tournament for Team USA.

Yamamoto was one of three WHL players invited to participate in the 2016 CCM/USA Hockey All-American Prospects Game. During the 2016–17 season, Yamamoto was named WHL Player of the Week week ending October 30, 2016, for registering seven points in four games. He was named to the 2016–17 Western Conference Second All-Star Team after ranking 6th overall in scoring with 42 goals and 57 assists for 99 points.

Professional
On June 23, 2017, Yamamoto was drafted in the first round, 22nd overall, in the 2017 NHL Entry Draft by the Edmonton Oilers. At the time, he drew comparisons to the Calgary Flames' Johnny Gaudreau (drafted 2011), particularly due to their similarity in size and playing style.

After an impressive training camp with the Oilers, Yamamoto made the opening night roster for the 2017–18 season. He made his regular-season debut on October 4, 2017, against the Calgary Flames in a 3–0 win, and recorded his first career point, an assist, on October 14 on an Adam Larsson goal against the Ottawa Senators. After playing his ninth game with the Oilers and recording 3 assists, Yamamoto was returned to Spokane to continue his development at the major junior level on November 6, 2017.

The Oilers included Yamamoto on their 25-player roster at the start of the 2018–19 NHL season. He recorded his first NHL goal on October 18, in a 3–2 overtime win over the Boston Bruins.

As a restricted free agent following the  season, Yamamoto avoided arbitration with the Oilers after re-signing to a two-year, $3.1 million per year contract extension on August 4, 2022.

After being sent back to Edmonton for injury reevaluation on November 10, 2022 while the team was on a road trip, Yamamoto remained out with an undisclosed injury, missing 7 games. Yamamoto was placed on injured reserve on November 27, 2022. He was activated off injured reserve on December 5, 2022 and scored his first goal of the 2022-23 season on December 9, 2022 in a game against the Minnesota Wild. Yamamoto was again placed on [long-term] injured reserve on January 17, 2023. He returned to play in a regular-season game against the New York Rangers on February 17, 2023. In the 15 games he has played in since his return from LTIR, he has gotten 5 goals and 1 assist in a combined total of 249:49 of ice-time. On March 3, 2023, he scored the fastest 2 goals (40 seconds apart) by an Oilers player since Taylor Hall in October of 2013.

International play
At the 2016 IIHF U18 World Championship in Grand Forks, North Dakota, Yamamoto scored 13 points in 7 games, including 7 goals, helping Team USA win bronze.

Yamamoto was selected to the Team America's under-20 team for the 2018 World Junior Championships in Buffalo, New York, winning bronze.

Personal life
His paternal great-grandfather, Saichi Yamamoto, was Japanese and immigrated to Hawaii, where he married his Japanese American wife Monoyo, who was born in Hawaii. They later relocated to Washington, where Yamamoto’s paternal grandfather Richard was born. Yamamoto’s grandmother, Carole Ann Kemp, was a European woman. Yamamoto and his older brother, Keanu, were taught to skate by Tyler Johnson's mother and would later train with Johnson in his offseason.

Career statistics

Regular season and playoffs

International

Awards and honors

References

External links

1998 births
Living people
American expatriate ice hockey players in Canada
American men's ice hockey right wingers
American people of Native Hawaiian descent
American sportspeople of Japanese descent
Bakersfield Condors players
Edmonton Oilers draft picks
Edmonton Oilers players
Ice hockey people from Washington (state)
National Hockey League first-round draft picks
Spokane Chiefs players
Sportspeople from Spokane, Washington